Jocelerme Privert (born 1 February 1953) is a Haitian accountant and bureaucrat who served as the interim President of Haiti from 2016 to 2017.

Political career

Early political career
A longtime politician, he first served as the economics and finance minister under Jean-Bertrand Aristide during 2001 and 2002. Aristide reappointed him Minister of Interior and Territorial Communities in 2002 and served until 2004 Haitian coup d'état that removed Aristide from the presidency.

Accusation of massacre and incarceration
Privert was accused of involvement in the La Scierie massacre in Saint-Marc and arrested on 4 April 2004. According to Haitian organizations defending human rights, dozens of people were killed in February 2004 in the town of Saint-Marc, an opposition stronghold at that time. Jocelerme Privert was released after 26 months in prison.

Later political career
After his release from prison, he served as an advisor to then-president René Préval. He subsequently ran for a senate seat in a 2008 by-election in Nippes department, but was not elected. He was later, eventually, elected Senator for Nippes department in the 2010 general elections, serving from 26 April 2011 and until he was elected by the Senate to serve as its president. He was also the President of the Senate Committee on Economy and Finance.

Provisional presidency
Privert was elected by the Senate as the provisional President of Haiti on 14 February 2016, pending a general election in no more than 120 days. A general run-off election date later agreed between Jovenel Moïse and Jude Célestin was originally scheduled to be held on 24 April 2016, but the Conseil Electoral Provisoire decided on 5 April 2016 to hold a new election in early October 2016.

On 14 June 2016, his presidential term expired, but he remained de facto president as the National Assembly refused to meet to appoint a successor. On February 7, 2017, he was succeeded by Jovenel Moïse of the political party Martelly founded, the Haitian Tèt Kale Party (PHTK) who won the November 2016 election.

Personal life
Privert met his wife, Ginette Michaud, a physician and radiologist, in 1986. The couple married in 1988 and had three daughters: Nandie, Fadha, and Nadia.

Privert is an accountant. He served in the General Tax Directorate (a governmental agency) from 1979 until the directorate was removed in 1999.

References

1954 births
2010s in Haiti
21st-century Haitian politicians
Haitian Interior Ministers
Living people
People from Nippes
Presidents of Haiti
Presidents of the Senate (Haiti)